This is a list of Canadian television related events from 2008.

Events

Debuts

Ending this year

Television shows

1950s
Hockey Night in Canada (1952–present, sports telecast)
The National (1954–present, news program)

1960s
CTV National News (1961–present)
Land and Sea (1964–present)
The Nature of Things (1960–present, scientific documentary series)
Question Period (1967–present, news program)
W-FIVE (1966–present, newsmagazine program)

1970s
Canada AM (1972–present, news program)
the fifth estate (1975–present, newsmagazine program)
Marketplace (1972–present, newsmagazine program)
100 Huntley Street (1977–present, religious program)

1980s
CityLine (1987–present, news program)
Fashion File (1989–2009)
Just For Laughs (1988–present)

1990s
CBC News Morning (1999–present)
Daily Planet (1995–present)
eTalk (1995–present, entertainment newsmagazine program)
The Passionate Eye (1993–present)
Royal Canadian Air Farce (1993–2008, comedy sketch series)
This Hour Has 22 Minutes (1992–present)

2000s
Atomic Betty (2004–present, children's animated series)
The Best Years (2007–present)
Billable Hours (2006–2008)
The Border (2008–present)
Canadian Idol (2003–2008)
Captain Flamingo (2006–present, children's animated series)
CBC News: Sunday Night (2004–present)
Chilly Beach (2003–present, animated series)
Class of the Titans (2005–2008, animated series)
Corner Gas (2004–2009)
Canada's Worst Driver (2005–present, reality series)
Le Cœur a ses raisons (2005–present)
Da Kink in My Hair (2007–present)
Degrassi: The Next Generation (2001–present)
Dragons' Den (2006–present)
Doc Zone (2006–present)
Durham County (2007–present)
ET Canada (2005–present)
Flashpoint (2008–present)
Global Currents (2005–present, newsmagazine/documentary series)
Grossology (2006–present, children's animated series)
The Guard (2008–present)
Heartland (2007–present)
The Hour (2005–present, talk show)
Instant Star (2004–2008)
JR Digs (2001–present, comedy prank series)
Kenny vs. Spenny (2002–2010, comedy reality series)
Little Mosque on the Prairie (2007–present)
Mantracker (2006–present, reality series)
Murdoch Mysteries (2008–present)
Odd Job Jack (animated series, 2003–present)
Paradise Falls (2001–present)
ReGenesis (2004–2008)
Restaurant Makeover (2005–2008)
Rick Mercer Report (2004–present)
Robson Arms (2005–2008)
6Teen (2004–present, animated series)
16x9 - The Bigger Picture (2008–present, newsmagazine program)
Total Drama (2007–present, animated series)
Trailer Park Boys (2001–2008)
Whistler (2006–2008)

TV movies & miniseries
Anne of Green Gables: A New Beginning
Guns
Murder on Her Mind
Sticks and Stones
The Terrorist Next Door
Victor
Would Be Kings

Television stations

Debuts

Network affiliation changes

See also 
 2008 in Canada
 List of Canadian films of 2008

References